The special territories of members of the European Economic Area (EEA) are the 32 special territories of EU member states and EFTA member states which, for historical, geographical, or political reasons, enjoy special status within or outside the European Union and the European Free Trade Association.

The special territories of EU member states are categorised under three headings: nine Outermost Regions (OMR) that form part of the European Union, though they benefit from derogations from some EU laws due to their geographical remoteness from mainland Europe; thirteen Overseas Countries and Territories (OCT) that do not form part of the European Union, though they cooperate with the EU via the Overseas Countries and Territories Association; and ten special cases that form part of the European Union (with the exception of the Faroe Islands), though EU laws make ad hoc provisions. The Outermost Regions were recognised at the signing of the Maastricht Treaty in 1992, and confirmed by the Treaty of Lisbon in 2007. 

The Treaty on the Functioning of the European Union states that both primary and secondary European Union law applies automatically to the outermost regions, with possible derogations due to the particularities of these territories. The Overseas Countries and Territories are recognised by the Article 198 of the Treaty on the Functioning of the European Union which allows them to opt into EU provisions on the freedom of movement for workers and freedom of establishment, and invites them to join the Overseas Countries and Territories Association (OCTA) in order to improve cooperation with the European Union. The status of an uninhabited territory, Clipperton, remains unclear since it is not explicitly mentioned in primary EU law and has a sui generis status at the national level. Collectively, the special territories encompass a population of some 6.1 million people and a land area of about 2,733,792 square kilometres (1,055,500 sq mi). Around 80 percent of this area is represented by Greenland. The largest region by population, the Canary Islands, accounts for more than a third of the total population of the special territories. The smallest by land area is the island of Saba in the Caribbean (13 km2 or 5 sq mi). The French Southern and Antarctic Lands is the only special territory without a permanent population.

Outermost Regions 
The Outermost Regions (OMR) are territories forming part of a member state of the European Union but situated a significant distance from mainland Europe. Due to this situation, they have derogation from some EU policies despite being part of the European Union.

According to the Treaty on the Functioning of the European Union, both primary and secondary European Union law applies automatically to these territories, with possible derogations to take account of their "structural social and economic situation (...) which is compounded by their remoteness, insularity, small size, difficult topography and climate, economic dependence on a few products, the permanence and combination of which severely restrain their development". All form part of the European Union customs area; however, some fall outside of the Schengen Area and the European Union Value Added Tax Area.

Seven Outermost Regions were recognised at the signing of the Maastricht Treaty in 1992. The Treaty of Lisbon included two additional territories (Saint Barthélemy and Saint Martin) in 2007. Saint Barthélemy changed its status from OMR to OCT with effect from 1 January 2012. Mayotte, which was an OCT, joined the EU as an OMR with effect from 1 January 2014.

The nine Outermost Regions of the European Union are:

Autonomous Regions of Portugal 

Azores and Madeira are two groups of Portuguese islands in the Atlantic. Azores and Madeira are integral parts of the Portuguese Republic, but both have the special status as Autonomous Regions, with a degree of self-governance. Some derogations from the application of EU law apply in regards to taxation, fishing and transportation. Their VAT is lower than the rest of Portugal, but they are not outside the EU VAT Area.

Canary Islands 
The Canary Islands are a Spanish archipelago off the African coast which form one of the 17 autonomous communities of Spain–the country's principal first-level administrative division. They are outside the EU VAT Area. The Canary Islands are the most populous and economically strongest territory of all the outermost regions in the European Union. The outermost regions office for support and information is located in these islands, in the city of Las Palmas on the island of Gran Canaria.

French overseas regions 

French Guiana, Guadeloupe, Martinique, Mayotte, and Réunion are five French overseas regions (which are also overseas departments) which under French law are, for the most part, treated as integral parts of the Republic. The euro is legal tender; however, they are outside the Schengen Area and the EU VAT Area.

Mayotte is the newest of the five overseas departments, having changed from an overseas collectivity with OCT status on 31 March 2011. It became an outermost region, and thus part of the EU, on 1 January 2014.

Collectivity of Saint Martin 
Saint Martin is the only overseas collectivity of France with the status of being an Outermost Region of the EU. As with the French overseas departments, the euro is legal tender in Saint Martin, and it is outside the Schengen Area and the EU VAT Area.

On 22 February 2007, Saint Martin and Saint Barthélemy were broken away from the French overseas department of Guadeloupe to form new overseas collectivities. As a consequence their EU status was unclear for a time. While a report issued by the French parliament suggested that the islands remained within the EU as outermost regions, European Commission documents listed them as being outside the European Community. The legal status of the islands was clarified on the coming into force of the Treaty of Lisbon, which listed them as an outermost region. However, Saint Barthélemy ceased being an outermost region and left the EU, to become an OCT, on 1 January 2012.

Overseas countries and territories 
The overseas countries and territories (OCT) are dependent territories that have a special relationship with one of the member states of the EU. Their status is described in the Treaty on the Functioning of the European Union, and they are not part of the EU or the European Single Market. The Overseas Countries and Territories Association was created to improve economic development and cooperation between the OCTs and the EU, and includes most OCTs except three territories which do not have a permanent local population.

The OCTs have been explicitly invited by the EU treaty to join the EU-OCT Association (OCTA). They were listed in the Article 198 of the Treaty on the Functioning of the European Union, which aside from inviting them to join OCTA, also provided them the opportunity to opt into EU provisions on the freedom of movement for workers and freedom of establishment. Yet, the freedom of establishment is limited by Article 203 TFEU and the respective Council Decision on OCTs. Its Article 51(1)(a) prescribes only that "the Union shall accord to natural and legal persons of the OCTs a treatment no less favourable than the most favourable treatment applicable to like natural and legal persons of any third country with whom the Union concludes or has concluded an economic integration agreement." Again this can be, according to Article 51(2)(b) limited. The obligations provided for in paragraph 1 of this Article shall not apply to treatment granted under measures providing for recognition of qualifications, licences or prudential measures in accordance with Article VII of the General Agreement on Trade in Services (GATS) or the GATS Annex on Financial Services.

The OCTs are not subject to the EU's common external customs tariffs but may claim customs on goods imported from the EU on a non-discriminatory basis. They are not part of the EU and the EU acquis does not apply to them, though those joining OCTA are required to respect the detailed rules and procedures outlined by this association agreement (Council Decision 2013/755/EU). OCTA members are entitled to ask for EU financial support.

When the Rome Treaty was signed in March 1957, a total of 15 OCTs existed: French West Africa, French Equatorial Africa, Saint Pierre and Miquelon, Comoros Archipelago, French Madagascar, French Somaliland, New Caledonia, French Polynesia, French Southern and Antarctic Lands, French Togoland, French Cameroons, Belgian Congo, Ruanda-Urundi, Trust Territory of Somalia, Netherlands New Guinea. The list was since then revised multiple times, and comprised—as noted by the Lisbon Treaty—25 OCTs in 2007. One of the French territories subsequently switched status from OMR to OCT (Saint Barthélemy), while another French territory switched from OCT to OMR (Mayotte). As of July 2014, there are still 13 OCTs (six with France, six with the Netherlands and one with Denmark) of which all have joined OCTA.

The 13 Overseas Countries and Territories of the European Union are:

Overseas Countries and Territories Association
The Overseas Countries and Territories Association (OCTA) is an organisation founded on 17 November 2000 and headquartered in Brussels. All OCTs have joined OCTA as of February 2020. Its purpose is to improve economic development in overseas countries and territories, as well as cooperation with the European Union. On 25 June 2008, a Cooperation Treaty between the EU and OCTA was signed in Brussels. The current chairman is Louis Mapou.

French overseas territories 
The French Southern and Antarctic Lands (which also include the French Scattered Islands in the Indian Ocean, and the French claim of Adélie Land ) are a disputed French Overseas Territory embodying the French claims to Antarctica but has no permanent population. It has sui generis status within France.

Saint Pierre and Miquelon, Saint Barthélemy, French Polynesia, and Wallis and Futuna are overseas collectivities (formerly referred to as overseas territories) of France, while New Caledonia is a "sui generis collectivity". Saint Barthélemy and Saint Pierre and Miquelon use the euro, while New Caledonia, French Polynesia and Wallis and Futuna use the CFP Franc, a currency which is tied to the euro and guaranteed by France. Natives of the collectivities are European citizens owing to their French citizenship and elections to the European Parliament are held in the collectivities.

On 22 February 2007, Saint Barthélemy and Saint Martin were separated from the French overseas department of Guadeloupe to form new overseas collectivities. As a consequence, their EU status was unclear for a time. While a report issued by the French parliament suggested that the islands remained within the EU as outermost regions, European Commission documents listed them as being outside the European Community. The legal status of the islands was clarified on the coming into force of the Lisbon Treaty which listed them as outermost regions. However, Saint Barthélemy ceased being an outermost region and left the EU, to become an OCT, on 1 January 2012. The change was made to facilitate trade with countries outside the EU, notably the United States, and was made possible by a provision of the Lisbon Treaty which allows the European Council to change the EU status of a Danish, Dutch, or French territory on the initiative of the member state concerned.

Dutch overseas territories 

Six territories of the Netherlands—all of which are Caribbean islands—have OCT status. As such, they benefit from being able to have their own export and import policy to and from the EU, while still having access to various EU funds (such as the European Development Fund). The inhabitants of the islands are EU citizens owing to their Dutch citizenship, with the right to vote in elections to the European Parliament. Initially they did not have voting rights for such elections, but the European Court of Justice granted them such rights, when they ruled their exclusion from the franchise was contrary to EU law, as all other Dutch citizens resident outside the EU did have the right to vote. None of the islands use the euro as their currency. The US dollar is used on Bonaire, Sint Eustatius and Saba, while Curaçao and Sint Maarten utilize their own shared currency the Antillean guilder, and finally the currency of Aruba is the Aruban florin.

Aruba, Curaçao, and Sint Maarten are classified as "countries" under Dutch law, and have considerable internal autonomy. In June 2008, the Dutch government published a report on the projected effect on the islands were they to join the EU as outermost regions. It concluded that the choice would be for the islands themselves to weigh up the advantages and disadvantages of becoming part of the EU as outermost regions, and that nothing would be done absent the islands specifically requesting it.

Bonaire, Sint Eustatius, and Saba (collectively called Caribbean Netherlands) are "special municipalities" of the Netherlands proper. Their current OCT status, and the prospect of advancing their status to become part of the EU as new OMRs (outermost regions), was reviewed by the Dutch parliament in 2015, as part of the planned review of the Dutch law (WOLBES and FINBES) concerning the quality of their recently implemented new public administration bodies. In October 2015, the review concluded the present legal structures for governance and integration with European Netherlands was not working well within the framework of WolBES, but no recommendations were made in regards of whether a switch from OCT to OMR status would help improve this situation.

The islands inherited their OCT status from the Netherlands Antilles which was dissolved in 2010. The Netherlands Antilles were initially specifically excluded from all association with the EEC by reason of a protocol attached to the Treaty of Rome, allowing the Netherlands to ratify on behalf of the Netherlands in Europe and Netherlands New Guinea only, which it subsequently did. Following the entry into force of the Convention on the association of the Netherlands Antilles with the European Economic Community on 1 October 1964, however, the Netherlands Antilles became OCTs.

Greenland 

Greenland joined the then European Community in 1973 as a county along with Denmark, but after gaining autonomy with the introduction of home rule within the Kingdom of Denmark, Greenland voted to leave in 1982 and left in 1985, to become an OCT. The main reason for leaving is disagreements about the Common Fisheries Policy (CFP) and to regain control of Greenlandic fish resources to subsequently remain outside EU waters. Greenlandic nationals (OCT-nationals) are, nonetheless, EU citizens due to Greenland's associated relationship with the EU within the meaning of EU treaties as well as holding Danish nationality.

The EU–Greenland relationship is a comprehensive partnership, which is complementary to the OCT association arrangements under "Council Decision 2013/755/EU"; based specifically on "Council Decision 2014/137 of 14 March 2014" (outlining the relations) and the Fisheries Partnership Agreement of 30 July 2006.

Special cases
While the outermost regions and the overseas countries and territories fall into structured categories to which common mechanisms apply, this is not true of all the special territories. 10 member state territories have ad hoc arrangements in their relationship with the EU. In those special cases, VAT rules do not apply and they may also be exempt from customs or excise rules.

Åland 
Åland, an autonomous archipelago belonging to Finland, but with partial autonomy, located between Sweden and Finland, with a Swedish-speaking population, joined the EU along with Finland in 1995. The islands had a separate referendum on accession and like the Finnish mainland voted in favour.

EU law, including the fundamental four freedoms, applies to Åland. However, there are some derogations due to the islands' special status. Åland is outside the VAT area and is exempt from common rules in relation to turnover taxes, excise duties and indirect taxation.
In addition, to protect the local economy, the treaty of accession allows for a concept of hembygdsrätt/kotiseutuoikeus (regional citizenship). Consequently, there are restrictions on the holding of property and real estate, the right of establishment for business purposes and limitations on who can provide services in Åland, for people not holding this status. The status may be obtained by any Finnish citizen legally resident in Åland for 5 years who can demonstrate an adequate knowledge of the Swedish language.

Büsingen am Hochrhein
The German village of Büsingen am Hochrhein is an exclave entirely surrounded by Switzerland, and as such is, for practical purposes, in a customs union with the latter non-EU country. The euro is legal tender, though the Swiss franc is preferred. Büsingen is excluded from the EU customs union and the EU VAT area. Swiss VAT generally applies. Büsingen was also outside of the Schengen area until Switzerland joined on 12 December 2008.

Campione d'Italia and Livigno
The Italian exclave village of Campione d'Italia is enclaved by Switzerland's Ticino canton as well as Lake Lugano (or Ceresio), and is a comune in the Province of Como, whilst Livigno, a small and remote mountain resort town, is a comune in the Province of Sondrio. Both comuni are part of the Lombardy region. Although part of the EU, Livigno is excluded from the customs union and VAT area, with Livigno's tax status dating back to Napoleonic times. Campione is excluded from the EU VAT area. It was excluded from the EU customs area until the end of 2019. Shops and restaurants in Campione accept payments in both euros and Swiss francs, and prices are displayed in both euros and Swiss francs.

Ceuta and Melilla

Ceuta and Melilla are two Spanish cities on the North African coast. They are part of the EU but they are excluded from the common agricultural and fisheries policies. They are also outside the customs union and VAT area, but no customs are levied on goods exported from the Union into either Ceuta and Melilla, and certain goods originating in Ceuta and Melilla are exempt from customs charges.

While nominally part of the Schengen Area (Schengen visas are valid), Spain performs identity checks on all sea and air passengers leaving the enclaves for elsewhere in the Schengen Area.

Small islands scattered along the northern coast of Africa, collectively known as plazas de soberanía are also integral parts of Spain since the 15th century, and therefore also part of the European Union. Their currency is the euro. They in general need permission to visit, so therefore identity is checked upon arrival. They are claimed by Morocco.

Cyprus

When the Republic of Cyprus became part of the European Union on 1 May 2004, the northern third of the island was outside of the effective control of its government due to the Turkish invasion of Cyprus, a United Nations buffer zone of varying width separated the two parts, and a further 3% of the island was taken up by UK sovereign bases (under British sovereignty since the Treaty of Establishment in 1960). Two protocols to the Treaty of Accession 2003—numbers 3 and 10, known as the "Sovereign Base Areas Protocol" and the "Cyprus Protocol" respectively – reflect this complex situation.

EU law only applies fully to the part of the island that is effectively controlled by the government of the Republic of Cyprus. EU law is suspended in the northern third of the island (the Turkish Republic of Northern Cyprus, whose independence is recognised only by Turkey) by article 1(1) of the Cyprus Protocol. If the island is reunified, the Council of the European Union will repeal the suspension by a decision. Four months after such a decision has been adopted, new elections to the European Parliament will be held on the island to elect Cypriot representatives from the whole of the island.

Cypriot nationality law applies to the entire island and is accordingly available to the inhabitants of Northern Cyprus and the British sovereign base areas on the same basis as to those born in the area controlled by the Republic of Cyprus. Citizens of the Republic of Cyprus living in Northern Cyprus are EU citizens and are nominally entitled to vote in elections to the European Parliament; however, elections to that Parliament are not organised in Northern Cyprus as it is governed de facto by a separate state, albeit a state recognized only by Turkey.

Akrotiri and Dhekelia
The United Kingdom has two sovereign base areas on Cyprus, namely Akrotiri and Dhekelia. Unlike other British overseas territories, their inhabitants (who are entitled to British Overseas Territories Citizenship) have never been entitled to British citizenship.

Prior to Cypriot accession to the EU in 2004, although the United Kingdom was an EU member at the time, EU law did not apply to the sovereign base areas. This position was changed by the Cypriot accession treaty so that EU law, while still not applying in principle, applied to the extent necessary to implement a protocol attached to that treaty. This protocol applied EU law relating to the Common Agricultural Policy, customs, indirect taxation, social policy and justice and home affairs to the sovereign base areas. The sovereign base areas' authorities also made provision for the unilateral application of directly applicable EU law. The UK also agreed in the Protocol to keep enough control of the external (i.e. off-island and northern Cyprus) borders of the base areas to ensure that the border between the sovereign base areas and the Republic of Cyprus could remain fully open and would not have to be policed as an external EU border. Consequently, the sovereign base areas would have become a de facto part of the Schengen Area if and when Cyprus implemented it. The base areas are already de facto members of the eurozone due to their previous use of the Cypriot pound and their adoption of the euro as legal tender from 2008.

Because Cypriot nationality law extends to Cypriots in the sovereign base areas, Cypriot residents, as citizens of the Republic of Cyprus, are entitled to EU citizenship. Just under half of the population of the sovereign base areas are Cypriots, the rest are British military personnel, support staff and their dependants. In a declaration attached to the Treaty of Establishment of the Republic of Cyprus of 1960, the British government undertook not to allow new settlement of people in the sovereign base areas other than for temporary purposes.

Under a protocol to the Brexit withdrawal agreement, certain provisions of EU law on agriculture, customs, indirect taxation, social security and border control continue to apply to the sovereign base areas.

United Nations buffer zone

The United Nations buffer zone between north and south Cyprus ranges in width from a few metres in central Nicosia to several kilometres in the countryside. While it is nominally under the sovereignty of the Republic of Cyprus, it is effectively administered by the United Nations Peacekeeping Force in Cyprus (UNFICYP). The population of the zone is 8,686 (as of October 2007), and one of the mandates of UNFICYP is "to encourage the fullest possible resumption of normal civilian activity in the buffer zone". Inhabited villages located in the buffer zone are legally administered by the Republic of Cyprus but policed by UN peacekeepers. Article 2.1 of the Cyprus Protocol allows the European Council to determine to what extent the provisions of EU law apply in the buffer zone.

Faroe Islands

The Faroe Islands are not part of the EU, and they have not been part of the EU since Denmark joined the community in 1973. Danish citizens residing on the islands are not considered citizens of a member state within the meaning of the treaties or, consequently, citizens of the European Union. However, Faroese people may become EU citizens by changing their residence to the Danish mainland.

The Faroe Islands are not part of the Schengen Area, and Schengen visas are not valid. However, the islands are part of the Nordic Passport Union and the Schengen Agreement provides that travellers passing between the islands and the Schengen Area are not to be treated as passing the external frontier of the Area. This means that there is no formal passport control, but an identity check at check-in for air or boat travel to the islands where Nordic citizens on intra-Nordic travel need no passport, only showing the ticket plus identity card.

Heligoland

It is part of the EU, but is excluded from the customs union and the VAT area.

Monastic community of Mount Athos
Monastic community of Mount Athos is an autonomous monastic region of Greece. Greece's EU accession treaty provides that Mount Athos maintains its centuries-old special legal status, guaranteed by article 105 of the Greek Constitution. It is part of the customs union but outside the VAT area. Notwithstanding that a special permit is required to enter the peninsula and that there is a prohibition on the admittance of women, it is part of the Schengen Area. The monastery has certain rights to house monks from countries outside the EU. A declaration attached to Greece's accession treaty to the Schengen Agreement states that Mount Athos's "special status" should be taken into account in the application of the Schengen rules.

Areas of extraterritoriality
The Saimaa Canal and Värska–Ulitina road are two of several distinct travel arrangements that exist or existed because of changes in borders over the course of the 20th century, where transport routes and installations ended up on the wrong side of the border. Some have become superfluous thanks to the Schengen Agreement. These listed examples pass the external EU border.

Saimaa Canal
Finland leases the -long Russian part of the Saimaa Canal from Russia and is granted extraterritoriality rights. The area is not part of the EU, it is a special part of Russia. Under the treaty signed by Finnish and Russian governments, Russian law is in force with a few exceptions concerning maritime rules and the employment of canal staff which fall under Finnish jurisdiction. There are also special rules concerning vessels travelling to Finland via the canal. Russian visas are not required for just passing through the canal, but a passport is needed and it is checked at the border. Euros are accepted for the canal fees. Prior to the 50-year lease renewal coming into effect in February 2012, the Maly Vysotsky Island had also been leased and managed by Finland. Since then it has been fully managed by Russian authorities, and is no longer part of the concession territory.

Värska–Ulitina road
The road from Värska to Ulitina in Estonia, traditionally the only road to the Ulitina area, goes through Russian territory for one kilometre (0.6 mi) of its length, an area called Saatse Boot. This road has no border control, but there is no connection to any other road in Russia. It is not permissible to stop or walk along the road. This area is a part of Russia but is also a de facto part of the Schengen area.

Switzerland
Some roads and railways along the border of Switzerland allow transit between two Swiss places through neighbouring countries without customs controls (and before 2008 passport controls), or between the border and international airports. See Privileged transit traffic#Switzerland.

Non-EU countries and territories with partial EU integration 
Special territories of some other European countries are strongly connected to the European Union. These are as follows:
special areas of the member states of the European Free Trade Association (EFTA):
Norway
Jan Mayen
Svalbard: Not part of the Schengen area, Norwegian VAT area or the EU single market; free movement of people into the territory regardless of nationality
Bouvet Island, Peter I Island and Queen Maud Land are disputed Norwegian territories embodying the Norwegian claims to Antarctica but have no permanent population.
Switzerland
Samnaun and Val Sampuoir: Outside Swiss VAT area
Basel Badischer Bahnhof platforms: part of EU Customs Union, VAT area and single market
the United Kingdom is not a member state of the EU anymore,  nevertheless, it has remained an associated country of the Euratom and is set to continue as participant in the EU's Joint European Torus and Fusion for Energy joint undertakings, as well as participant in the Euratom Supply Agency, the European Institute of Innovation and Technology and the executive agencies of the EU, while some of its territories and the Crown Dependencies are to remain partially integrated with the EU:
Northern Ireland remains under the Northern Ireland Protocol of the Brexit withdrawal agreement de facto part of the European Single Market and the European Union Customs Union for the purposes of goods only, in order to prevent the creation of a customs border on the island of Ireland; along with the remainder of the United Kingdom, the Crown Dependencies and the Republic of Ireland, it has continued to form the Common Travel Area outside of the Schengen Area.
Akrotiri and Dhekelia, a British territory, is partially integrated with Cyprus in the areas of agriculture, currency, customs, indirect taxation, social security and border control.
Gibraltar, also a British territory, is in negotiations with the EU for an arrangement to participate in the Schengen Area and (with exceptions) the Single Market, pending implementation.

Summary

Special territories of EU member states
This table summarises the various components of EU laws applied in the special territories of EU member states.

Special territories of other European states
Special territories of EFTA states and some other European countries also have a special status in regard to EU laws applied.

Former special territories
Many currently independent states or parts of such were previously territories of the following EU members since the latter joined the EU or, previously the European Coal and Steel Community (ECSC):
 Belgium (with multiple territories, from ECSC formation until 1962)
 France (with multiple territories, from ECSC formation)
 Italy (with Italian Somaliland, from ECSC formation until 1960)
 The Netherlands (with multiple territories, from ECSC formation)
 Portugal (with multiple territories, from 1986 enlargement until 2002)
 United Kingdom (with multiple territories, from 1973 enlargement)
Most of these territories seceded before the implementation of the Maastricht Treaty in 1993 and the following years, meaning that cooperation like the EU citizenship, the VAT union or the Eurozone did not exist, so it made less difference to be a special territory then.

These were:
 Cambodia (gained independence from France in 1953), no Community treaty applied there, besides ECSC preferences
 Laos (gained independence from France in 1954), no Community treaty applied there, besides ECSC preferences
 Vietnam (gained independence from France in 1954), no Community treaty applied there, besides ECSC preferences
 Tunisia (gained independence from France in 1956), no Community treaty applied there, besides ECSC preferences
 Morocco (gained independence from France in 1956), no Community treaty applied there, besides ECSC preferences
 Guinea (gained independence from France in 1958), had OCT status
 Cameroon (French-administered part gained independence from France in 1960 along with some of UK-administered parts); had OCT status for the French part
 Togo (gained independence from France in 1960), had OCT status
 Mali (gained independence from France in 1960), had OCT status
 Senegal (gained independence from France in 1960), had OCT status
 Madagascar (gained independence from France in 1960), had OCT status
 DR Congo (gained independence from Belgium in 1960), had OCT status
 Somalia (Italian-administered part gained independence from Italy in 1960 along with UK-administered part); had OCT status for the Italian part
 Benin (gained independence from France in 1960), had OCT status
 Niger (gained independence from France in 1960), had OCT status
 Burkina Faso (gained independence from France in 1960), had OCT status
 Ivory Coast (gained independence from France in 1960), had OCT status
 Chad (gained independence from France in 1960), had OCT status
 Central African Republic (gained independence from France in 1960), had OCT status
 Congo (gained independence from France in 1960), had OCT status
 Gabon (gained independence from France in 1960), had OCT status
 Mauritania (gained independence from France in 1960), had OCT status
 Burundi (gained independence from Belgium in 1962), had OCT status
 Rwanda (gained independence from Belgium in 1962), had OCT status
 Netherlands New Guinea (transferred from the Netherlands to UN in 1962, later annexed by Indonesia), had OCT status
 Suriname (gained independence from the Netherlands in 1975), had OCT status, EURATOM application unsure.
 Algeria (gained independence from France in 1962), had a status similar to OMR
 Bahamas (gained independence from the UK in 1973), had OCT status
 Grenada (gained independence from the UK in 1973), had OCT status
 Comoros (gained independence from France in 1975), had OCT status
 Seychelles (gained independence from the UK in 1976), had OCT status
 French Somaliland (gained independence from France as Djibouti in 1977), had OCT status
 Solomon Islands (gained independence from the UK in 1978), had OCT status
 Tuvalu (gained independence from the UK in 1978), had OCT status
 Dominica (gained independence from the UK in 1978), had OCT status
 Saint Lucia (gained independence from the UK in 1979), had OCT status
 Kiribati (gained independence from the UK in 1979), had OCT status
 Saint Vincent and the Grenadines (gained independence from the UK in 1979), had OCT status
 Zimbabwe (gained de jure independence from the UK in 1980), no Community treaty applied there, besides ECSC preferences
 Vanuatu (gained independence from the UK and France in 1980), generally had OCT status
 Belize (gained independence from the UK in 1981), had OCT status
 Antigua and Barbuda (gained independence from the UK in 1981), had OCT status
 Saint Kitts and Nevis (gained independence from the UK in 1983), had OCT status
 Brunei (gained independence from UK in 1984), had OCT status
 Hong Kong (sovereignty transferred from the UK to China in 1997), no Community treaty applied there, besides ECSC preferences
 Macao (sovereignty transferred from Portugal to China in 1999), EURATOM was applicable, besides the ECSC preferences
 Timor-Leste (East Timor) (gained independence from Indonesia in 2002, considered under Portuguese administration before that), no Community treaty applied there 

The United Kingdom left the EU in 2020. When it was a member, some of its Crown Dependencies and Overseas Territories were partially integrated with the EU.
Gibraltar was part of the EU and partially inside its single market.
Jersey, Guernsey and the Isle of Man were not part of the EU, but were in its customs union and enjoyed free trade.
Akrotiri and Dhekelia continue to have partial integration with Cyprus, an EU member state, even after the UK is no longer an EU member.
Other territories which were Overseas Territories that year had OCT status.

Additionally in Europe there were special territories in the past that had different status than their "mainland", because of various reasons, but now are part of a member state. Some of these territories were as follows:
 The Austrian areas of Kleinwalsertal and Jungholz formerly enjoyed a special legal status. The two areas have road access only to Germany, and not directly to other parts of Austria. They were in customs and currency union with Germany and there were no border controls between Kleinwalsertal and Jungholz, respectively, and Germany. When Austria entered the EU (and its customs union) in 1995, the customs union became defunct. The entry into force of the Schengen Agreement for Austria (1997) and the introduction of the euro (2002) caused Kleinwalsertal and Jungholz to lose their remaining legal privileges. It is now legally treated in the same manner as the rest of Austria.
 Saar (merged with West Germany on 1 January 1957), was fully part of the Community as French-administered European territory
 West Berlin (merged with West Germany on 3 October 1990), was subject to the full application of the treaties
 East Germany was until 1972 on paper a part of one Germany and the European Community, since West Germany, the NATO countries and the European Community did not recognize East Germany until 1972. East Germany did not recognize any membership of the EC. The West German government treated trade with East Germany as inter-German trade and not subject to the EC trade tariffs.

The following areas are still special member state territories, but have changed their status. See their entries in the article for details.
 Greenland
 Saint Barthélemy
 Mayotte

See also 

 Dependent territory
 Elections to the European Parliament
 Enlargement of the European Union
 European Union Association Agreement
 European Union law
 Eurosphere
 Eurozone
 Foreign relations of the European Union
 Freedom of movement for workers in the European Union
 
 Future enlargement of the European Union
 History of the European Union
 Member state of the European Union
 Microstates and the European Union
 Opt-outs in the European Union
 Outline of the European Union
 Withdrawal from the European Union

Notes

References

External links
 
 Information on the "Territorial status of EU countries and certain territories" from the European Commission
 Review of CARIFORUM-EU EPA – and Implications for the British and Dutch Caribbean Octs – What the CARIFORUM-EU trade deal means for current EU territories
 Regional policy & outermost regions

Foreign relations of the European Union

da:Oversøiske lande og territorier